TransParente is a Brazilian podcast released on November 7, 2022. The podcast features a dialogue about motherhood and transsexuality.

History 
The podcast portrays the gender-affirming surgery process of internet celebrity and author Sophia Mendonça, who is an autistic and transgender woman. It is derived from a series of videos shown on the YouTube channel Mundo Autista, both hosted by mother and daughter Selma Sueli Silva and Sophia Mendonça.

This documentary main focuses on the perspective of the relationship between Sophia Mendonça and her mother, the businesswoman and former radio personality Selma Sueli Silva. In this way, it mixes data and experiences to focus on love and the search for family harmony.

The podcast focuses on the mother's role in the relationship between motherhood and transsexuality. In the documentary, Silva reinforces the importance of family members not trying to manipulate and mold their children to their desires. She also said that she noticed signs of her daughter's gender dysphoria even in childhood.

TransParent was selected to compete at the British festival Lift-Off Filmmaker Sessions.

References 

Audio podcasts
Audio documentaries
Documentaries about LGBT topics
LGBT-related podcasts
Transgender-related mass media